The 1949 Australia rugby union tour of New Zealand was a series of 12 rugby union matches played by the "Wallabies" in 1949. The Australians lost only one match, and won the Test series 2-0.

At the same time, a 30-man All Black squad was touring South Africa. On 3 September 1949, New Zealand lost two test matches on the same day - one in South Africa, the other at home to Australia.

"The New Zealand Rugby Union ... decided that the 1949 matches against Australia would have full test status, even though the country's top 30 players were in South Africa. One of the reasons for the decision was to not deprive test caps to three of the All Blacks, Johnny Smith, Ben Couch and Vincent Bevan who were not considered for the South African tour because they were Māori (although Bevan was not regarded as eligible for the Māori All Blacks). All three would surely have otherwise gone to South Africa (also probably Ronald Bryers and Nau Cherrington)."

Matches 
Scores and results list Australia's points tally first.

Bibliography 
 
All found on link

References

Australia national rugby union team tours of New Zealand
Australian Rugby Union
New Zealand Rugby Union